Southern Alta (also known as Kabuloan Dumagat, Kabuluen, Kabulowan or Kabuluwan, Kabuluwen, Ita, Baluga, Pugot), is a distinctive Aeta language of the mountains of northern Philippines. This article will discuss Southern Alta's location, vocabulary, similarities and differences shared with other languages of the Philippines. Southern Alta is one of many endangered languages that risks being lost if it is not passed on by current speakers. Most speakers of Southern Alta also speak Tagalog.

Southern Alta is not particularly close to Northern Alta or to other languages of Luzon. Both Northern and Southern Alta have a significant proportion of vocabulary that is unique to each other, however, they are also very different from the other. Many Southern Alta also interact primarily with Tagalog speakers, sharing similarities between both languages. Tagalog is a more widely spoken language in the Philippines, using an alphabet that has five vowels and fifteen consonants. Although Southern Alta and Tagalog share similarities, Southern Alta still remains a very distinct language that constitutes at least one coordinate branch of the large Meso-Cordilleran group of Northern Luzon languages.  The Southern Alta are also commonly referred to Kabuluwan, which may associate them with the Bulu, a small river flowing west past Malibay in Northern Bulacan Province.

As a critically endangered language, Southern Alta has very few speakers. Currently, Southern Alta has a population of 1,000 speakers.

Geographic distribution 
Southern Alta is spoken primarily in the Sierra Madre of eastern Nueva Ecija and in nearby coastal areas of Quezon Province. Lawrence Reid collected data from San Miguel, located east of Rio Chico, a barrio (barangay) of General Tinio, Nueva Ecija. There are also Southern Alta living further south near Norzagaray in Bulacan (Reid 2013: 339). A phonologically more conservative dialect is spoken by a group known as the Edimala in Dicapanikian and Dicapanisan, on the coast north of Dingalan (Reid 2013: 339).

Abreu (2018) reported Southern Alta speakers to be living in Sitio Bato, Barangay Sapang Bulac, Doña Remedios Trinidad Municipality, Bulacan, who had been forcibly resettled from Hilltop, Norzagaray, Bulacan by the National Power Corporation (NPC). Many have intermarried with the Umiray Dumaget. There are also Southern Alta people living with the Tagalog in Sitio Tubigan, Barangay Kalawakan, Doña Remedios Trinidad Municipality, but they no longer speak the Southern Alta language.

History 
Prior to 1937, no information is available on the early history of the language. The research available to date has a direct bearing problem on when and how the Philippines began speaking the language of Southern Alta.

Dialects 
Southern Alta is a very distinct language; however, it shares similarities to the language Tagalog, and Northern Alta. Southern Alta may be distantly related to other Philippine languages as well. Southern Alta is most similar to Northern Alta, with a lexical similarity of 34%. Sharing those similarities can be viewed as dialect borrowing, which is borrowing sounds, grammar, or vocabulary.

Endangerment of the language 
Today, Southern Alta risks becoming extinct in the near future. With only 1,000 speakers, or less, the language is categorized as critically endangered. Due to Southern Alta not being a common spoken language in the Philippines, it is likely that the language will soon be lost and will not continue to be passed down, eventually becoming a "dead language".

Grammar 
There is not much known about the language of Southern Alta because it is a little known language of the Philippines. The only data previously available on Southern Alta is an unpublished wordlist of 350 words collected by Wesley Petro (1974), formerly of New Tribes Mission.

Vocabulary 
To get a better understanding of a few words, as well as the language of Southern Alta, below is a table of words in English and how that word would be translated in Southern Alta.  

Unique forms – Southern Alta. 

Northern and Southern Alta are distantly related languages. Below is a table that shows similarities between words spoken in both Southern Alta (ALTS) and Northern Alta (ALTN).

Uniquely shared lexical items – Northern and Southern Alta.

References

Further reading
 Southern Alta at Ethnologue (18th ed., 2015)
 Hammarström, Harald; Forkel, Robert; Haspelmath, Martin; Bank, Sebastian, eds. (2016)
 Reid, Lawrence A. 1994. "Possible Non-Austronesian Lexical Elements in Philippine Negrito Languages." In Oceanic Linguistics, Vol. 33, No. 1 (Jun. 1994), pp. 37–72.
 Reid, Lawrence. The Alta Languages of the Philippines (1991)
 Reid, Lawrence. Who Are the Philippine Negritos? Evidence from Language (2013)
 Dutton, Tom. Tyron, Darrell. Language Contact and Change in the Austronesian World (1994)
 Alta, Southern https://www.ethnologue.com/language/agy (2017)
 Southern Alta Language http://glottolog.org/resource/languoid/id/sout2905 (2017)

Aeta languages
Languages of Nueva Ecija
Languages of Quezon